Darryl Pinckney (born 1953 in Indianapolis, Indiana) is an American novelist, playwright,  and essayist.

Early life
Pinckney grew up in a middle-class African-American family in Indianapolis, Indiana, where he attended local public schools. He was educated at Columbia University in New York City.

Career
Some of Pinckney's first professional works were theatre texts, plays developed in collaboration with director Robert Wilson. These included the produced works of The Forest (1988) and Orlando (1989).
Pinckney returned to theatre with Time Rocker (1995).

His first novel was High Cotton (1992), a semi-autobiographical novel about "growing up black and bourgeois" in 1960s America. His second novel was Black Deutschland (2016), about a young gay black man in Berlin in the late 1980s, just before the fall of the Berlin Wall. Pinckney is also a frequent contributor to the New York Review of Books, Granta, Slate, and The Nation. He frequently explores issues of racial and sexual identities, as expressed in literature.

In the 21st century, Pinckney has published two collections of essays on African-American literature. He has expressed his admiration for the writing of the long-running American CBS soap opera, As the World Turns.

Awards
1986, Whiting Award 
1992, High Cotton won the Los Angeles Times Art Seidenbaum Award for First Fiction.  
1994, the Vursell Award for Distinguished Prose from the American Academy of Arts and Letters
His 2022 book Come Back in September was a finalist for the 2023 National Book Critics Circle award in autobiography.

Personal life
He is gay. His partner is English poet James Fenton; the couple has been together since 1989. Pinckney lives in New York City and Oxfordshire, England.

Bibliography

Books
 High Cotton (novel; 1992)
 Sold and Gone: African American Literature and U.S. Society (2001)
 Out There: Mavericks of Black Literature (2002)
 Blackballed: The Black Vote and US Democracy (2014)
 Black Deutschland (2016)
 Busted in New York and Other Essays (2019; Foreword by Zadie Smith)
 Come Back in September: A Literary Education on West Sixty-seventh Street, Manhattan (2022)

Selected essays
 (Subscription Required)

Theatre texts
(Collaborations with Robert Wilson)
 The Forest (1988)
 Orlando (1989)
 Time Rocker (1995)

References

External links
Darryl Pinckney website
Darryl Pinckney at the New York Review of Books
Profile at The Whiting Foundation

1953 births
Living people
Writers from Indianapolis
African-American novelists
21st-century essayists
20th-century American novelists
American gay writers
American LGBT novelists
21st-century American novelists
LGBT African Americans
20th-century American male writers
21st-century American male writers
Novelists from Indiana
Columbia College (New York) alumni
20th-century African-American writers
21st-century African-American writers
21st-century LGBT people
African-American male writers